

Acts of the National Assembly for Wales

|-
| {{|National Health Service (Indemnities) (Wales) Act 2020|cyshort=Deddf y Gwasanaeth Iechyd Gwladol (Indemniadau) (Cymru) 2020|anaw|2|26-02-2020|maintained=y|archived=n|An Act of the National Assembly for Wales to amend the National Health Service (Wales) Act 2006 to make provision about indemnities in respect of expenses and liabilities arising in connection with the provision of health services.|cylong=Deddf Cynulliad Cenedlaethol Cymru i ddiwygio Deddf y Gwasanaeth Iechyd Gwladol (Cymru) 2006 a gwneud darpariaeth ynghylch indemnio treuliau ac atebolrwyddau sy'n codi mewn cysylltiad â darparu gwasanaethau iechyd.}}
|-
| {{|Children (Abolition of Defence of Reasonable Punishment) (Wales) Act 2020|cyshort=Deddf Plant (Diddymu Amddiffyniad Cosb Resymol) (Cymru) 2020|anaw|3|20-03-2020|maintained=y|archived=n|An Act of the National Assembly for Wales to abolish the common law defence of reasonable punishment in relation to corporal punishment of a child taking place in Wales; and for connected purposes.|cylong=Deddf Cynulliad Cenedlaethol Cymru i ddiddymu amddiffyniad cosb resymol yn y gyfraith gyffredin mewn perthynas â rhoi cosb gorfforol i blentyn sy'n digwydd yng Nghymru; ac at ddibenion cysylltiedig.}}
}}

Acts of Senedd Cymru

|-
| {{|Wild Animals and Circuses (Wales) Act 2020|cyshort=Deddf Anifeiliaid Gwyllt a Syrcasau (Cymru) 2020|asc|2|07-09-2020|maintained=y|archived=n|An Act of the National Assembly for Wales to make it an offence to use wild animals in travelling circuses; and to make miscellaneous changes to the licensing of circuses and dangerous wild animals.|cylong=Deddf Cynulliad Cenedlaethol Cymru i'w gwneud yn drosedd i ddefnyddio anifeiliaid gwyllt mewn syrcasau teithiol; ac i wneud newidiadau amrywiol i drefniadau trwyddedu syrcasau ac anifeiliaid gwyllt peryglus.}}
}}

Notes

References

2020